Bisht is a surname found in the Indian state of Uttarakhand, Himachal Pradesh and country Nepal. The term "Bisht" originally referred to someone who held a land grant from the government. The Bisht families in Uttarakhand were chiefly Thokdars(Zamindars) of Thuljat origin.In Uttrakhand, Bishts are generally Kshatriya Rajputs. In Nepal, Bisht was adopted as a surname by Raute and Raji people. Bishta, as Bista, was also used as a surname used by Khas people, group under the caste Chhetri.

Notable people
 
 
Ajay Mohan Bisht, better known as Yogi Adityanath; Indian politician and Chief Minister of Uttar Pradesh
Barkha Bisht (born 1979), Indian television actress
Dan Singh Bisht, Indian businessman and philanthropist 
Donal Bisht, Indian television actress 
Ekta Bisht, Indian cricket player
Harish Bisht, vice admiral of the Indian Navy
Himanshu Bisht, Indian cricketer
Hira Singh Bisht, Indian politician
Madhumita Bisht (born 1964), Indian badminton player
Mohan Singh Bisht (born 1957), Indian politician
Puneet Bisht (born 1986), Indian cricketer
Ranbir Singh Bisht (1928–1998), Indian painter
Ravindra Singh Bisht (born 1944), Indian archaeologist
Shruti Bisht (born 2002), Indian film and television actress
Sonam Bisht, Indian model and actress

See also 
 Bista, Nepalese Chhetri (Kshatriya) variant of the same surname

Notes

References 

Social groups of Uttarakhand
Rajput clans of Uttarakhand
Ethnic groups in Nepal
Nepali-language surnames
Khas surnames